The Story of the Vatican is a 1941 American documentary directed by Jean Pages. The film was written by and stars Fulton J. Sheen (who would later become an archbishop in the Roman Catholic Church), and was the second of only four full-length features produced by The March of Time, better known for their newsreels. It was distributed by RKO Radio Pictures, which released the film on July 18, 1941.

See also
 Index of Vatican City-related articles

References

External links

1941 films
1941 in Vatican City
Documentary films about Catholicism
Films shot in Italy
The March of Time films
Vatican City in World War II
American documentary films
1941 documentary films
American black-and-white films
1940s American films